BlackBerry OS is a discontinued proprietary mobile operating system developed by Canadian company BlackBerry Limited for its BlackBerry line of smartphone handheld devices. The operating system provides multitasking and supports specialized input devices adopted by BlackBerry for use in its handhelds, particularly the trackwheel, trackball, and most recently, the trackpad and touchscreen.

The BlackBerry platform natively supports corporate email, through Java Micro Edition MIDP 1.0 and, more recently, a subset of MIDP 2.0, which allows complete wireless activation and synchronization with Microsoft Exchange, Lotus Domino, or Novell GroupWise email, calendar, tasks, notes and contacts, when used with BlackBerry Enterprise Server.  The operating system also supports WAP 1.2.

Updates to the operating system were automatically available from wireless carriers that support the BlackBerry over the air software loading (OTASL) service.

Third-party developers wrote software using the available BlackBerry API classes, although applications that make use of certain functionality must be digitally signed.

Research from June 2011 indicated that approximately 45% of mobile developers were using the platform at the time of publication.

BlackBerry OS was discontinued after the release of BlackBerry 10 in January 2013, and support for it ceased after January 4, 2022.

Release history

BlackBerry 9720
The BlackBerry 9720 runs a version of BlackBerry OS 7.1 with updates to the user interface that mimics BlackBerry 10, including a new lock screen, redesigned Application Switcher, Music, Pictures, Videos and Phone apps.

Availability

While BlackBerry Limited develops and releases updated versions of its operating system to support each device, it is up to individual carriers to decide if and when a version is released to its users.

Presently, BlackBerry OS has reached end-of-life. Therefore, devices running it are no longer sold.

BlackBerry fonts
The following is a list of fonts that are included in some versions of BlackBerry (some of them are not included in older versions):

Andalé Mono
Arial
BBAlpha Sans
BBAlpha Sans Condensed
BBAlpha Serif
BBCAPITALS
BBCCasual
BBClarity

BBCondensed
BBGlobal Sans
BBGlobal Serif
BBMilbank
BBMilbank Tall
BBSansSerif
BBSansSerifSquare
BBSerifFixed

Comic Sans MS
Courier New
Georgia
Impact
Tahoma
Times New Roman
Trebuchet MS
Verdana

BBAlphaSans and BBAlphaSerif are based on the free software DejaVu fonts.

BlackBerry Tablet OS

On September 27, 2010, BlackBerry Ltd. announced a new unrelated QNX-based platform, BlackBerry Tablet OS, to run on its BlackBerry PlayBook tablet computer.

See also
 BlackBerry (company)
 BlackBerry 10
 Comparison of mobile operating systems
 Index of articles related to BlackBerry OS
 Usage share of operating systems
 List of BlackBerry products

References

External links
 

BlackBerry
 
Discontinued operating systems
Embedded operating systems
Mobile operating systems
ARM operating systems
Smartphone operating systems
C++ software